Athletics events at the 2012 Summer Paralympics were held in the Olympic Stadium and in The Mall in London, United Kingdom, from 31 August to 9 September 2012. 43 events were staged for athletes with spinal cord disabilities, and 3 staged jointly with cerebral palsy classes.

Classification
Athletes were given a classification depending on the type and extent of their disability. The classification system allowed athletes to compete against others with a similar level of function.

The athletics classifications are:
11–13: Blind (11) and visually impaired (12, 13) athletes
20: Athletes with an intellectual disability
31–38: Athletes with cerebral palsy
40: Les Autres (others) (including people with dwarfism)
42–46: Amputees
51–58: Athletes with a spinal cord disability

The class numbers were given prefixes of "T" and "F" for track and field events, respectively.

Medal summary

Men's events

(*) class F32 athlete

Women's events

See also
Athletics at the 2012 Summer Olympics

References

External links
International Paralympic Committee - Athletics classification regulations

T F51-58